Santa Rita is a corregimiento in Antón District, Coclé Province, Panama. Its population as of 1990 was 2,065; its population as of 2000 was 2,368.

References

Corregimientos of Coclé Province